The traditional list of the ancient Tibetan rulers consists of 42 names. The first 26 rulers may belong to the realm of legend, as there is insufficient evidence of their existence, but modern scholars believe that the kings from no. 27 to no. 32 were historical. The rulers from no. 33 to no. 42 are well documented in many reliable Tibetan, Chinese and foreign sources.

A unified Tibetan state did not exist before the times of the kings number 31, 32, and 33. The earlier rulers, known as the Yarlung dynasty, were probably just local chiefs in the Yarlung Valley area, certainly not emperors of Tibet.

List 
In the list the common transliteration is given first, the academic one in brackets.

See also 
Pre-Imperial Tibet
Tibetan Empire
List of rulers of Tibet
List of Lönchen of Tibetan Empire

Notes

References
McKay, Alex (ed.). Tibet and Her Neighbors: A History (2003) Walther Konig. 

Tibet
Emperors